Billy Ocasio is a former senior advisor to Illinois Governor Pat Quinn appointed to work on social justice issues.  He began his appointment on June 1, 2009 after it had been announced on May 12, 2009.

Prior to his appointment, Ocasio served as the 26th Ward alderman in the Chicago City Council.

Early life 
Ocasio is a lifelong resident of  Humboldt Park where he attended Von Humboldt Elementary School and Roberto Clemente Community Academy.

Aldermanic career 
Ocasio was appointed alderman in 1993 by Mayor Richard M. Daley to fill the unexpired term of Luis Gutierrez, who was elected congressman.

As alderman, Ocasio fought for the construction of the new Ames School; helped bring a YMCA to the 26th ward; and worked for the construction of the Humboldt Park Public Library. Ocasio also led a $16 million rehab for Humboldt Park which included renovating the boat house and lagoon.

Ocasio was Chairman of the Human Relations Committee. Additionally, he served on five other committees: Budget and Government Operations; Education; Energy, Environmental Protection, and Public Utilities; Finance; and Housing and Real Estate.

Cook County Commissioner and 26th Ward Committeeman Roberto Maldonado was tapped to replace Ocasio in the Chicago City Council in 2009.

Personal life 
Alderman Ocasio and his family (Veronica Ocasio, Ismael Sanchez, Gabriel Ocasio, Antonio Ocasio, and Milo Sanchez (dog).)

The family attends church at New Life Covenant Ministries in Chicago.

He attended the University of Illinois at Urbana-Champaign and is a member of Iota Phi Theta fraternity.

External links 
 Alderman Ocasio's Website

References 

Chicago City Council members
American political consultants
Hispanic and Latino American politicians
Living people
Year of birth missing (living people)